Llanmerewig is a historic parish in Powys, Wales, in the  historic county of Montgomeryshire,  and is situated between Newtown and Welshpool. The church and small village stand on high ground, which overlooks the river Severn, and is close to Abermule; part of which lies within the parish. The river Severn forms the North Western boundary of the parish and the Eastern boundary is the river Mule, which cuts through a steep gorge, before entering the Severn at Abermule. The historic parish covered 1,023 acres.

Saint Llwchaiarn
The Church is dedicated to the 6th-century Saint Llwchaiarn or Lluwchaiarn, who was also the patron saint of the adjacent Llanllwchaearn and of two parishes in Ceredigion. The placename presents a problem as it would be expected that the llan ("parish") would proceed the recognizable name of its patron saint, but this is not the case. The most likely explanation is that the placename has been corrupted from  Lam-yr-ewig or "Hind’s Leap". The 16th-century Welsh poet, Sion Keri uses the name "Lamerewig" as the placename and describes the various feats and miracles attributed to the saint which include slaying a dragon and causing a hind to leap into a pool of water.

The church
Located on a lane 400m N of Llanmerewig village to the east of Church Farm. The church is situated in an oval churchyard (typical of a "llan’’ enclosure) bounded by a masonry wall. The medieval church has largely disappeared as church underwent major alterations on two occasions in the C19.  The first alterations were undertaken from 1839 to 1843 by the rector, John Parker (1798-1860), an enthusiastic advocate of the Gothic style. The present curiously slender tower and a semi-dormer window on the S side were added at this time, and the porch was richly ornamented. The second series of restorations took place in 1892 and were more conventional in style; plans were prepared by Sir Aston Webb and the work was funded by Charles Whitley Owen of Fronfraith Hall. The E and N walls were rebuilt, and a new E window was built to match the old Medieval window which was removed to the E boundary wall of the churchyard, where it remains.. A fragment of the 15th century Rood Screen survives in the reconstructed screen of 1892.

Rectors

1537  David ap Llenn 
1560  Thomas ap David
1564  Thomas Jenkin
1567  Griffith Jones
1573  Robert Myddelton
1575  Gregory Jones 
1617  John Price
1618  John Lloyd
1620  Matthew Evans
1635  Edward Jones A.M.
1643  Thomas Bright A.M.
1666  Thomas Evance 
1688  John Evance 
1700  Ellis Jones 
1700  Robert Smith
1732  Richard Lewis
1762  Roderick Jones 
1782  Edward Vardy 
1797  Roderick Jones 
1798  Llewelyn Davies
1827  John Parker A.M.
1844  John Lloyd A.M.

Administrative history
In the Medieval period Llanmerewig was in the Commote of Cedewain in the Kingdom of Powys. Llanmerewig appears to have consisted of only one or two townships, Llanmerewig itself and Cilgwrgan; which in the Medieval period may have been a township. In 1885, the township of Bolbro, which was previously in Llandyssil parish, was transferred to Llanmerewig. For ecclesiastical administration the parish is in the Diocese of St Asaph, the Archdeaconry of Montgomery and the Deanery of Cedewain. In 1974, as a result of Local Government reform, Llanmerewig was joined with Llandyssil Parish Council to become a Community Council within the new Montgomeryshire District Council. In 1984 the Community Council was renamed Abermule with Llandyssil Community Council. At this time, the Community Council covered the old parishes of Llanmerewig and Llandyssil, together with Dolforwyn, which had been a township in Bettws Cedewain parish. In 1996, with the abolition of the Montgomeryshire District Council, the Community Council became part of the Powys County Council unitary authority.

Notable people
John Lloyd (1844–1910), cricketer and barrister

References

Villages in Powys
History of Powys
History of Montgomeryshire
Historic Montgomeryshire Parishes